Vermont Route 17 (VT 17) is a  state highway in western Vermont in the United States. The western terminus of the route is at the New York state line in Addison, where it connects to New York State Route 185 (NY 185) by way of the Lake Champlain Bridge. Its eastern terminus is at a junction with VT 100 in Waitsfield. VT 17 was initially much shorter than it is today, extending from the Champlain Bridge to Addison upon assignment. It was extended east through the Green Mountains to Waitsfield in 1965.

Route description
The routing of VT 17 varies greatly on opposite sides of the Bristol town center. West of Bristol, the route passes through generally level terrain and connects multiple communities. East of Bristol, VT 17 is more mountainous and more rural in nature.

West of Bristol
VT 17 begins at the New York state line over Lake Champlain, where it connects to NY 185 at the midpoint of the Lake Champlain Bridge. The route heads northeastward from the state line, descending the eastern bridge approach and intersecting VT 125 adjacent to the Chimney Point State Historical Site at Chimney Point.

VT 17 continues east from Addison, crossing over the Otter Creek and intersecting VT 23 near Weybridge prior to curving to the northeast toward Waltham. Midway between Waltham and New Haven, VT 17 briefly overlaps with U.S. Route 7 (US 7), before continuing eastward through New Haven to Bristol. As the route approaches the village of Bristol, it meets VT 116 at an intersection just west of the community. VT 116 turns east here, joining VT 17 through Bristol along Main Street.

East of Bristol
Outside Bristol, VT 17 and VT 116 are joined by the New Haven River, here marking the northern boundary of the Green Mountain National Forest. The roadway and waterway head east, following a winding route through the Green Mountains. When New Haven splits off to the southeast shortly afterward, VT 17 and VT 116 continue north along Baldwin Creek up to the point where VT 17 and VT 116 diverge. While VT 116 continues north along Beaver Brook, VT 17 remains in the vicinity of Baldwin Creek as it heads northeast through the Green Mountains.

Midway between Bristol and Waitsfield, VT 17 intersects Gore Road, a local road that leads toward Burlington  to the north. The route crosses into Chittenden County, as well as the Camel's Hump State Park, shortly afterward. The route leaves Chittenden County and passes into Washington County  later upon traversing the Appalachian Gap, a mountain pass located to the north of Mount Ellen.

History

The road connecting the ferry landing at Chimney Point to the town center of Addison was designated as VT F-7 ca. 1927. The ferry crossed Lake Champlain into Port Henry. VT F-7 was extended eastward to US 7 in New Haven by 1929. In 1929, the Champlain Bridge opened, connecting Chimney Point to Crown Point. By the following year, the segment of VT F-7 west of VT 30A (now VT 22A) in Addison was renumbered to VT 17, which now began on the Champlain Bridge at the New York state line. In 1933, all of VT 17 and the portion of VT F-7's former routing between Addison and New Haven were added to the state highway system. Prior to this time, maintenance of both roads was performed by the towns through which they passed. VT 17 was subsequently extended eastward to New Haven along VT F-7's former routing. As part of the 1935 state highway expansion, additional mileage was added to VT 17, which was extended  to VT 116 in Bristol.

In 1936, a  portion of the McCullough Turnpike in Fayston, which was chartered in 1933 but proved unprofitable, was deeded back to the state of Vermont and renamed to McCullough State Highway. The road, which extended eastward from the Chittenden–Washington county line, was paved during the period of 1936 and 1940. The rest of the McCullough Turnpike to VT 100 in Waitsfield became part of the state highway system in 1956. In 1965, the state legislature authorized the extension of VT 17 from Bristol to the Addison–Chittenden county line, connecting it to the McCullough State Highway by way of Chittenden County's section of the former McCullough Turnpike. The VT 17 designation was extended eastward through Chittenden County and along the McCullough State Highway at this time.

VT 17's connection to the state of New York was temporarily severed in October 2009 when the Champlain Bridge was closed due to safety concerns. The bridge was demolished two months later, truncating VT 17 to the eastern shoreline of Lake Champlain until its replacement, the Lake Champlain Bridge, opened to traffic on November 7, 2011.

Major intersections

See also

References

External links

017
Transportation in Addison County, Vermont
Transportation in Chittenden County, Vermont
Transportation in Washington County, Vermont